Giuseppe Paladino may refer to:

Joe Paladino - Goalkeeper
Giuseppe Paladino (1721-1794) - Baroque painter of Messina
Giuseppe Paladino (1886-1937) - Sicilian historian
Giuseppe Paladino (1856-1922) - Sicilian painter